The 2012–13 Super Division (51st edition), Algeria's top tier basketball club competition, ran from October 19, 2012 through May 4, 2013. We recall that the Super Division is composed this season of twenty clubs including four new ones promoted (USM Alger, CRM Birkhadem, CSMBB Ouargla, COBB Oran). The clubs, divided into two groups A and B, will play a first phase of 18 days, after which the first four of each group will play the second phase, which will determine the 2012/2013 Super Division champion. The other clubs will defeat for the playdown in Super Division or the relegation. A first in national basketball, and which plebiscites an Eastern club that has gradually returned to the front of the scene over the previous three seasons. the new champion of Algeria, season 2012-13, is named CSM Constantine after winning against the champion in the last three seasons GS Pétroliers with a total of 2-1 led by US players Little Theo and Bryant. after this win, the team will be the representative of Algeria in the 2013 FIBA Africa Clubs Champions Cup for the first time in the history of Algerian basketball.

ABC Super Division Participants (2012–13 Season)

Regular Season (October 19, 2012 - March 16, 2013)

Groupe A

 Note: Small number and number in brackets indicate round number and leg, respectively Next scheduled games

Groupe B

 Note: Small number and number in brackets indicate round number and leg, respectively Next scheduled games

Regular season standings

Groupe A
Updated as of 13 October 2017.

 1 loss by default (no point awarded)
 Advance to play-offs Advance to play-out

Groupe B
Updated as of 13 October 2017

 1 loss by default (no point awarded)
 Advance to play-offs Advance to play-out

Stage 2 play-offs (March 29 - April 13, 2018)

Results in detail

Play-off standings

 Advance to championship Final

Playdown

Results

Playdown standings

 Relegated to Nationale B

Championship final

Team champions

References

Algerian Basketball Championship seasons
League
Algeria